Robin Pacek (born 17 March 1991) is a Swedish judoka. He competed at the 2016 Summer Olympics in the men's 81 kg event, in which he was eliminated in the second round by Travis Stevens. He also competed in the 2020 Olympics in Tokyo.

Personal life 
Pacek's father Ryszard Pacek was a Polish Greco-Roman wrestler who emigrated to Sweden in the late 1970s. His older brother Martin is also a judoka.

References

External links
 
 
 
 

1991 births
Living people
Swedish male judoka
Judoka at the 2016 Summer Olympics
Olympic judoka of Sweden
People from Kristianstad Municipality
Swedish people of Polish descent
European Games competitors for Sweden
Judoka at the 2015 European Games
Judoka at the 2019 European Games
Judoka at the 2020 Summer Olympics
Sportspeople from Skåne County
21st-century Swedish people